Nebraska Highway 58 is a highway in Nebraska. Much of the route lies near the Loup River. The southern terminus is at an intersection with U.S. Highway 281 south of St. Paul. The northern terminus is at an intersection with Nebraska Highway 70 east of Arcadia.

Route description
Nebraska Highway 58 begins at U.S. Route 281 near St. Libory, heading west through farmland. At Dannebrog, the road forms a concurrency with Nebraska Highway 11 and heads southwest. The two roads split and Highway 58 heads west as it passes through Boelus. In Rockville, the road intersects Nebraska Highway 68 and turns northwest. In Loup City, Highway 58 becomes concurrent with Nebraska Highway 92 and turns west, intersecting Nebraska Highway 10. Past Loup City, Highway 58 splits from Highway 92 and continues north to its terminus  near Arcadia at Nebraska Highway 70.

Major intersections

References

External links

Nebraska Roads: NE 41-60

058
Transportation in Valley County, Nebraska
Transportation in Sherman County, Nebraska
Transportation in Howard County, Nebraska